Mellininae is a very small subfamily of wasps, comprising only 17 described species in two genera. Occasionally this group has been treated as a separate family (Mellinidae), but has been more typically considered a subfamily within the all-inclusive family Sphecidae.

References

 Catalog of Sphecidae that includes Mellininae, at Cal Academy

Crabronidae
Apocrita subfamilies